Ulrich Lange (born 6 June 1969) is a German lawyer and politician of the Christian Social Union in Bavaria (CSU) who has been serving as a member of the Bundestag from the state of Bavaria since 2009.

Political career 
Born in Meran, Lange became a member of the Bundestag in the 2009 German federal election, representing the Donau-Ries constituency. In parliament, he served on Committee on Economic Affairs and Technology (2009-2013), the Committee on Labour and Social Affairs (2009-2013) and the Committee on Transport (2009-2017). From 2014 until 2017, he was his parliamentary group’s spokesperson on transport. 

In the negotiations to form a coalition government under the leadership of Chancellor Angela Merkel following the 2017 federal elections, Lange was part of the working group on transport and infrastructure, led by Michael Kretschmer, Alexander Dobrindt and Sören Bartol. Since early 2018, he has been serving as deputy chairman of the CDU/CSU parliamentary group, under the leadership of successive chairmen Volker Kauder (2018) and Ralph Brinkhaus (since 2018).

Other activities 
 Augsburg University of Applied Sciences, Member of the Board of Trustees
 Federal Network Agency for Electricity, Gas, Telecommunications, Posts and Railway (BNetzA), Alternate Member of the Rail Infrastructure Advisory Council (since 2014)
 Deutsche Flugsicherung (DFS), Member of the Advisory Board (2014-2018)

References

External links 

  
 Bundestag biography 

1969 births
Living people
Members of the Bundestag for Bavaria
Members of the Bundestag 2021–2025
Members of the Bundestag 2017–2021
Members of the Bundestag 2013–2017
Members of the Bundestag 2009–2013
People from Merano
Members of the Bundestag for the Christian Social Union in Bavaria